Northamptonshire Healthcare NHS Foundation Trust (NHFT) is an NHS Foundation Trust (NHFT) founded 1 May 2009 which provides mental health and community services across Northamptonshire, England, and specialist services in prisons.

NHFT manages the following main locations:

 St Mary's Hospital, Kettering
 Berrywood Hospital, Northampton
 Campbell, Newland, and Lotus Houses, Northampton
 Isebrook Hospital, Wellingborough
 Danetre Hospital, Daventry
 Corby Community Hospital and Willowbrook Health Centre, Corby
 Brackley Community Hospital, Brackley

The chief executive of NHFT, Angela Hillery, was a finalist for the HSJ Chief Executive of the Year in November 2015. The trust was rated 'Good' by the Care Quality Commission in March 2017, and 'Outstanding' In 2018 and 2019 respectively. The Board of Directors are responsible for overseeing the work and services of the Trust and setting their future activity. The Board is made up of both executive directors (employed directly by the Trust) and non-executive directors (appointed by the Council of Governors).

Partnership and NHFT 
NHFT works in partnership with organisations across the county and England, which include:

 3Sixty Care GP Federation is a joint venture which covers Corby, East Northamptonshire, Wellingborough, and surrounding areas.
 Northamptonshire Health and Care Partnership (NHCP), formerly known as the Northamptonshire STP; is made up of key health and care providers in the county who seek to improve health and care for people living in Northamptonshire. All organisations have their individual responsibilities for the services they provide but are committed to working together towards the shared NHCP vision for a positive lifetime of health, well-being, and care in our community. 

In May 2021 NHFT stated in Northampton County Court that service users are not entitled to compensation for confidentiality breaches as they are prone to getting upset.

See also

 List of NHS trusts

References

NHS foundation trusts
NHS mental health trusts
Health in Northamptonshire